Islam Arous (born 6 August 1996) is an Algerian footballer.

Career
In November 2017, Arous was called up to the Algeria national team for the first time for a 2018 FIFA World Cup qualifier against Nigeria and a friendly match against the Central African Republic. On 14 November Arous made his international debut, starting in the 3-0 win over Central African Republic.

Honours
Paradou AC
Algerian Ligue Professionnelle 2: 2016–17

References

External links
 

1996 births
Algeria international footballers
Algerian footballers
Algerian Ligue Professionnelle 1 players
Algerian Ligue 2 players
Living people
Paradou AC players
People from Algiers Province
Association football fullbacks
21st-century Algerian people